Chris Gaines is a one-off fictional rock persona created as a movie character for Garth Brooks to explore musical styles far removed from his success as a country singer.

Initially, Brooks planned to feature the Gaines persona in The Lamb, a motion picture that never materialized. In 1999, Brooks released one album as Gaines; the album produced two charting Billboard singles, including the Top 5 pop hit "Lost in You".

History 
  
In 1999, Brooks and his production company Red Strokes Entertainment, with Paramount Pictures, began to develop a film in which Brooks would star. The Lamb was to have revolved around Chris Gaines, a fictional rock singer and his emotionally conflicted life as a musician in the public eye. To create buzz for the project, Brooks took on the identity of Gaines in the October 1999 album Garth Brooks in...the Life of Chris Gaines, which was intended as a "pre-soundtrack" to the film. The project – a departure from Brooks' usual material – was intended to represent the "greatest hits" of Gaines' entire career, spanning several decades of supposed recordings. Although Brooks himself developed the Gaines character and backstory, he did not write any of the songs on the album.

To promote the album's release, Brooks appeared as Gaines in a television "mockumentary" for the VH1 series Behind the Music and as the musical guest on an episode of Saturday Night Live, which he hosted as himself.

The album – and Brooks' promotion of it – received a lukewarm reception. The album received mixed reviews, and Brooks' fans responded with general confusion as to the purpose of the project. Although the album made it to No. 2 on the Billboard 200, expectations had been higher and retail stores began heavily discounting their oversupply. Less than expected sales of the album (more than two million) and no further developments in the production of the film as a result brought the project to an indefinite hiatus in February 2001, and the Gaines character quickly faded into obscurity.

Despite the less than spectacular response to the project, Brooks gained his first – and, to date, only – Billboard Hot 100 Top 40 single with "Lost in You", the first single from the album. Critic Stephen Thomas Erlewine of AllMusic speculated that the alternate persona and elaborate marketing scheme backfired, writing, "When Brooks' new persona and his album were revealed to the public, they were unforgiving – they didn't think he was playing a role, they simply thought he'd lost his mind." However, Erlewine gave the album a 3-out-of-5 stars rating and in the same review later wrote: "Judged as Brooks' first pop album, it's pretty good, and if it had been released that way, it likely would have been embraced by a wide audience."

In March 2021, Brooks announced that The Life of Chris Gaines was to be rereleased on multiple platforms, including digital and vinyl, adding that previously unreleased songs were also forthcoming.

Discography

Studio albums

Singles

Notes
A^ "It Don't Matter to the Sun" did not enter the Billboard Hot 100 but peaked at number 13 on the Bubbling Under Hot 100 Singles chart.

Music videos

References

External links 
Official Chris Gaines Myspace
USA Today: Kansas City crowd welcomes Brooks back to the stage

Alter egos
Fictional rock musicians
Fictional characters invented for recorded music
Fictional people from Queensland